Hulsey is an unincorporated community in Washington County, in the U.S. state of Missouri.

History
A post office called Hulsey was established in 1890, and remained in operation until 1916. The community has the name of an early citizen.

References

Unincorporated communities in Washington County, Missouri
Unincorporated communities in Missouri